Malipiero is a Venetian surname of Bohemian origin, also documented as Mastropiero or Maripiero.

Malipiero can refer to:

People

 Domenico Malipiero (1428–1515), Venetian naval captain
 Felicia Malipiero, Dogaressa of Venice by marriage to the Doge Pietro I Orseolo and mother of doge Pietro II Orseolo
 Francesco Malipiero (1824–1887), Italian opera composer, grandfather of Gian Francesco Malipiero
 Gian Francesco Malipiero (1882–1973), Italian composer
 Giovanni Malipiero (1906–1970), Italian tenor
 Pasquale Malipiero, called the dux pacificus (1392–1462), Venetian statesman and 66th Doge of Venice
 Riccardo Malipiero (cellist) (1886–1975), brother of Gian Francesco Malipiero
 Riccardo Malipiero (1914–2003), Italian composer and pianist, son of cellist Riccardo Malipiero, nephew of Gian Francesco Malipiero

Locations
 Palazzo Malipiero, a palace in Venice, Italy.
 Palazzo Malipiero-Trevisan

References

Italian-language surnames